Thunukkai is a town in the Mullaitivu District, Sri Lanka. It is located about 17 km from Mankulam & 4 km from Mallavi.

Towns in Mullaitivu District
Thunukkai DS Division